Sphaeromeria cana (recently proposed name Artemisia albicans) is a species of flowering plant in the family Asteraceae known by the common name gray chickensage. It is native to the western United States, where it is known from the Sierra Nevada, the adjacent desert ranges of eastern California and Nevada, and Steens Mountain of Oregon. It grows in dry, rocky mountain habitat, such as cracks and crevices, including the talus above the tree line. This is an aromatic  subshrub with numerous erect branches growing up to 30 to 60 centimeters tall. It is gray-green in color and coated with woolly fibers. The leaves are linear or lance-shaped, the lower ones divided into lobes. The inflorescence is generally a cluster of flower heads lined with woolly phyllaries and containing yellow disc florets. There are no ray florets. The fruit is a ribbed achene about 2 millimeters long.

References

External links
Jepson Manual Treatment
USDA Plants Profile
Flora of North America
Photo gallery

Anthemideae
Flora of California
Flora of Nevada
Flora of Oregon
Flora of the Great Basin
Flora of the Sierra Nevada (United States)
Flora without expected TNC conservation status